Hyagnis may refer to:

Hyagnis (beetle), a genus of insects in the family Cerambycidae
Hyagnis (mythology), a Phrygian musician